Persicula cingulata is a species of very small sea snail, a marine gastropod mollusk or micromollusk in the family Cystiscidae.

Description

Distribution
This marine species occurs off Senegal, Mauritania and the Cape Verdes

References

 Adanson, M., 1757 Histoire naturelle du Sénégal. Coquillages, p. 275 p, 19 pls
 Fischer-Piette, E., 1942. Les mollusques d'Adanson. Journal de Conchyliologie 85: 104-366
 Rolán E., 2005. Malacological Fauna From The Cape Verde Archipelago. Part 1, Polyplacophora and Gastropoda.
 Wolff, W.J.; Duiven, P.; Esselink, P.; Gueve, A. (1993). Biomass of macrobenthic tidal flat fauna of the Banc d'Arguin, Mauritania. Hydrobiologia 258(1-3): 151-163

External links
 Dillwyn, L. W. (1817). A descriptive catalogue of Recent shells, arranged according to the Linnean method; with particular attention to the synonymy. London: John and Arthur Arch. Vol. 1: 1-580; Vol. 2: 581-1092 + index
 Hutton, F. W. (1873). Catalogue of the marine Mollusca of New Zealand with diagnoses of the species. Didsbury, Wellington. xx + 116 pp

Cystiscidae
Gastropods described in 1817
Cingulata